Mammuthus rumanus is a species of mammoth that lived during the Pliocene what is today Eastern Europe. Fossil remains have been found in the United Kingdom and Romania.

Evolution
Recent revalidation of the species Mammuthus rumanus influences several interrelated aspects of mammoth evolution. European material referred to M. rumanus might provide a useful background for the identification of finds from Africa and the Middle East. It seems plausible that M. rumanus originated in Africa c. 3.5 Ma and migrated to Eurasia via the Levant. While remaining poorly known, M. rumanus apparently played a significant role in the dispersal of mammoths to Eurasia, and any additional information on that species might elucidate problems of the earlier stages of mammoth evolution in Africa and their subsequent dispersal.

References 

Mammoths
Pliocene proboscideans
Prehistoric mammals of Europe